For the 1955 Vuelta a España, the field consisted of 106 riders; 63 finished the race.

By rider

By nationality

References

1955 Vuelta a España
1955